Cielo de Angelina (International title: Angelina's Sky / ) is a Philippine television drama series broadcast by GMA Network. Directed by Omar Deroca, it stars Bea Binene in the title role. It premiered on October 22, 2012 on the network's late morning line up. The series concluded on January 4, 2013 with a total of 55 episodes.

The series is streaming online on YouTube.

Premise
The series follows the life and love of Angelina, an orphan girl who was left by the door of El Cielo Shelter for Destitute Women and Abandoned Children one stormy night. Marco, a four-year-old stowaway was there when Sister Margaret picked the baby. Because of being abandoned, Marco and Angelina treated the shelter as their home. 
 
Through the years, Marcos serves as the older brother of Angelina especially when her best friend, Julie was adopted. Since then, it was Marco who helped Angelina on her longing for Julie. It was also Marco who will help Angelina in trying to find out what was left by her parents when she was abandoned. But when Angelina tries to get the clue inside Sister Margaret's office, a fire breaks out in another part of the shelter causing the latter to die.
 
Separation ensued when Angelina was adopted and in turn leaving Marco in the orphanage. While Angelina is living a tormented life with her stepmother Czarina and stepsister Rhoda, Marco now acts very distant from her.

Cast and characters

Lead cast
 Bea Binene as Angelina Nantes
An orphan girl who was left on the doorstep of an orphanage run by nuns, one stormy night. There, she grows up with Marco, who also serves as her older brother. Marco also helps Angelina to search for her parents. But just as they were on to something, Angelina is adopted and thus begins her life of torment.

Supporting cast
 Jake Vargas as Marco Sevilla
When he was a little boy when he witnessed Angelina's arrival as a baby in El Cielo. Since then, he has acted as an older brother figure to her, especially when her best friend, Julie was adopted. He will soon find himself falling in love with Angelina. But under the circumstances, his love will remain undeclared and unrequited.
 Hiro Peralta as James Aragon
 Ashleigh Nordstrom as Marian "Julie" Dela Guardia
 Roxanne Barcelo as Elaine
A mother and a resident of El Cielo Shelter for Destitute Women and Abandoned Children. She rebuilds her life after being abandoned by her boyfriend with the help of Dr. Frank, her newfound love.
 Victor Basa as Frank Cordero
The resident doctor of El Cielo Shelter. Dr. Cordero is a wealthy and handsome doctor who has a big heart for the less fortunate. He eventually falls in love with Elaine, a single mother.
 Izzy Trazona-Aragon as Dena
 Debraliz Borres as Susan
 Baby O'Brien as Miriam "Mamer" Dela Guardia
 Yassi Pressman as Rhoda
Czarina's only daughter, and like her mother, she is also a self-centered and scheming young lady whose habit is making Angelina's life unbearable.
 Gloria Romero as Sor Margaret

Guest cast
 Jillian Ward as young Angelina
 Elijah Alejo as young Julie
 Miggy Jimenez as young Marco
 Jessa Zaragoza as Theresa Alfonso
A successful woman with a traumatic past. Despite her success and wealth, she feels that there's a big part of her life that is missing.
 Gerald Madrid as Benjamin "Benjie" Nantes
 Isabel Granada as Czarina
The scheming arch-enemy of the story. She is Benjie Nantes' vindictive mistress who will stop at nothing to get what she wants. She and her daughter, Rhoda will make life difficult for Angelina.
 Stephanie Sol as Perlita Zulueta
 Rina Reyes as Elena
 Kathleen Hermosa as Marilyn Nantes
 Vangie Labalan as Rosario
 Biboy Ramirez as Armando
 Renz Valerio as Keith
 Lindt Johnston as Kelly
 Nicole Dulalia as Bernie
 Jolo Romualdez as Randy
 Maey Bautista as Simang
 Derick Lim as Elly
 Jak Roberto as Andrei
 Marco Masa
 Andrea Brillantes as Bernadeth Nantes

Production and development
Cielo de Angelina is the very first television production of GMA Films for GMA Network. Film outfit's key persons, Annette Gozon-Abrogar (President) and Jose Mari Abacan (Supervising Producer and GMA Network's Vice President for Program Management) come up with the idea to produce a light yet inspiring drama series intended for the network's morning timeslot, and to pit against the rival station's romantic-comedy series, as well. “It will be a test as to which genre between drama and comedy will really get public attentions,” Abacan said. The production team began developing the storyline in July 2012, under the title “Angelina del Cielo”, with theme focusing on love, friendship, and family The producer hired first-timer director Omar Deroca to helm the series. Production began on October 5, 2012 in Montalban, Rizal. Locations were chosen by the series’ production designer, Potchi Manda, due to the area's calmly and provincial-type surroundings.

Casting
GMA Films chose teen actors Bea Binene and Jake Vargas to lead their first television venture. Before they started filming the series, Binene and Vargas talked about the acting they will do in the soap [including the approach to their characters]. “We didn’t attend workshops. But we are used to doing drama. We already have an idea on what to do. That’s perhaps our preparation,” Vargas said.

Jessa Zaragoza was chosen to play Theresa Alfonso, the main protagonist's biological mother. The singer-actress stated that it's her first time doing a character of a politician and revealed that Lucy Torres is her peg for her role. Mico Palanca was originally cast as Benjamin Nantes, but due to “unprofessionalism” and “he doesn’t want to play a father role” issues, he was replaced by Gerald Madrid. Drastic revisions were made to the script. The writers found that they had to adjust the character of Benjamin to suit for Madrid.

Music
The classic Filipino inspirational song, “Natutulog Ba Ang Diyos?” (lit. Is God Sleeping?) was used as the series’ theme song. It was written and composed by Nonong Buencamino. The lyrics tell of a person asking questions why difficulties exists in life, was God really sleeping.

The show used seven versions of the song throughout its run: the main theme, which was performed by Jonalyn Viray; duet versions of the song performed by Jillian Ward and Viray, and Ward and Bea Binene; solo versions of  Binene, Jessa Zaragoza, and Jake Vargas; and the trio version of song performed by Viray, Ward and Binene.

Ratings
According to AGB Nielsen Philippines' Mega Manila household television ratings, the pilot episode of Cielo de Angelina earned an 11.8% rating. While the final episode scored a 9.4% rating.

References

External links
 

2012 Philippine television series debuts
2013 Philippine television series endings
Filipino-language television shows
GMA Network drama series
Television shows set in the Philippines